Mark Neville Atkinson (born 11 February 1969, in Sydney, New South Wales) is a former Australian cricket player, who played for Tasmania. He played for the Tigers from 1990 until 2000, and was a regular feature in both their first class and one-day sides.

Mark Atkinson is a current cricket coach and former first-class player, representing Tasmania, the Prime Ministers XI and Australia 'A' teams in a successful 10-year career throughout the 1990s and early 2000s.

Atkinson was a cornerstone player in an excellent era for Tasmanian and Australian cricket, serving as the Tigers' wicketkeeper-batsman throughout. In a team that featured record-breaking players like Ricky Ponting, Colin Miller, Dene Hills, Jamie Cox and Michael DiVenuto, Atkinson's first-class record rendered him unlucky not to receive full Test honours. Nevertheless, Atkinson carved a fine reputation as an outstanding gloveman and consistent batsman and went on to play in multiple Sheffield Shield finals. He currently holds the record for the most dismissals by a Tasmanian wicketkeeper.

Through both playing and now coaching, Atkinson's involvement in cricket spans from grassroots through to the elite level. Today, he is founder and Managing Director of Elite Cricket, a cricket coaching venture that services players of all skill-levels in Sydney and its surrounds. His insight and coaching methods have seen him sought out for private sessions with current and former Test cricketers and professionals alike.

See also
 List of Tasmanian representative cricketers

External links
Cricinfo profile

1969 births
Living people
Tasmania cricketers
Australian cricketers
Cricketers from Sydney
Australian cricket coaches